Bademdere is a belde (town) in Niğde Province, Turkey

Geography
Bademdere is in the rural area of Çamardı district which is a part of Niğde Province. The town is on the northern slopes of Taurus Mountains with an average altitude of  The population of the town is 1,976 as of 2011.

History
The settlement had been established in the 18th century by the miners from Gümüşhane Province in the Black Sea region, who came to work in the various mines (lead, zinc and lignite) in Taurus Mountains. Later, agriculture replaced mining and they began producing fruits. In 1972, the settlement was declared township.

Economy
The main economic activity is agriculture. Apple is the most pronounced crop. Potatoes and almonds are also produced. In fact, the name of the town means literally "almond creek". Demirkazık, one of the peaks of Taurus Mountains is just at the east of the town and mountaineering-based tourism also seems promising.

References

Çamardı towns and villages